There have been two baronetcies created for persons with the surname Ellis, both in the Baronetage of the United Kingdom. Both creations are extinct.

The Ellis Baronetcy, of Byfleet in the County of Surrey and of Hertford Street, Mayfair, in the County of Middlesex, was created in the Baronetage of the United Kingdom on 6 June 1882 for Sir John Ellis on his retirement as Lord Mayor of London. The title became extinct on his death in 1912.

The Ellis Baronetcy, of Threshfield in the West Riding of the County of York, was created in the Baronetage of the United Kingdom on 24 June 1932 for the Conservative politician Robert Ellis. The title became extinct on his death in 1956.

Ellis baronets, of Byfleet and Hertford Street (1882)
Sir John Whittaker Ellis, 1st Baronet (1829–1912)

Ellis baronets, of Thresfield (1932)
Sir Robert Geoffrey Ellis, 1st Baronet (1874–1956)

References

Extinct baronetcies in the Baronetage of the United Kingdom